Tea culture is defined by how tea is made and consumed, how people interact with tea, and the aesthetics surrounding tea drinking.

Tea plays an important role in some countries. It is commonly consumed at social events, and many cultures have created intricate formal ceremonies for these events. East Asian tea ceremonies, with their roots in the Chinese tea culture, differ slightly among East Asian countries, such as the Japanese or Korean variants. Tea may differ widely in preparation, such as in Tibet, where the beverage is commonly brewed with salt and butter. Tea may be drunk in small private gatherings (tea parties) or public (tea houses designed for social interaction).

Afternoon tea is a British custom with widespread appeal. The British Empire spread an interpretation of tea to its dominions and colonies, including modern-day regions of Hong Kong, India, and Pakistan, which had pre-existing tea customs, as well as regions such as East Africa (modern-day Kenya, Tanzania, and Uganda) and the Pacific (Australia and New Zealand) which did not have tea customs. The tea room or teahouse is found in the US, Ireland and many Commonwealth cities.

Different regions favour different varieties of tea—white, yellow, green, oolong, black, or post-fermented (dark)—and use different flavourings, such as herbs, milk, or sugar. The temperature and strength of the tea likewise vary widely.

East Asia

China

Due to the importance of tea in Chinese society and culture, tea houses can be found in most Chinese neighbourhoods and business districts. Chinese-style tea houses offer dozens of varieties of hot and cold tea concoctions. They also serve a variety of tea-friendly or tea-related snacks. Beginning in the late afternoon, the typical Chinese tea house quickly becomes packed with students and business people, and later at night, playing host to insomniacs and night owls simply looking for a place to relax.

There are formal tea houses. They provide a range of Chinese and Japanese tea leaves, tea-making accoutrements, and a better class of snack food. Finally, some tea vendors specialize in selling tea leaves, pots, and other related paraphernalia. Tea is an essential item in Chinese culture and is mentioned in the seven necessities of (Chinese) daily life.

During the Tang dynasty, Lu Yu found that the plants which grow under shady hillsides produced poor-quality tea, often resulting in abdominal distension. The common tea-making methods at the time were boiling the water and tea leaves simultaneously. The water was heated in a cauldron on a brazier to the first boil level, described as "fish eyes". Appropriate salts were added to the water to enhance the flavor of the tea.

Two periods

In China, at least as early as the Tang dynasty, tea was an object of connoisseurship; in the Song dynasty, formal tea-tasting parties were held, comparable to modern wine tastings. As much as in contemporary wine tastings, the proper vessel was necessary, and much attention was paid to matching the tea to an aesthetically appealing serving vessel.

Historically there were two phases of tea drinking in China based on the form of tea that was produced and consumed: tea bricks versus loose leaf tea.

Tea brick phase

Tea served before the Ming dynasty was typically made from tea bricks. Upon harvesting, the tea leaves were either partially dried or thoroughly dried and ground before being pressed into bricks. The pressing of Pu-erh is likely a relic of this process. Tea bricks were also sometimes used as currency.  Serving the tea from tea bricks required multiple steps:
Toasting: Tea bricks are usually first toasted over a fire to destroy any mould or insects that may have burrowed into the tea bricks. Such infestation sometimes occurred since the bricks were stored openly in warehouses and storerooms. Toasting likely imparted a pleasant flavour to the resulting tea.
Grinding: The tea brick was broken up and ground to a fine powder. This practise survives in Japanese powdered tea (matcha).
Whisking: The powdered tea was mixed into hot water and frothed with a whisk before serving. The colour and patterns formed by the powdered tea were enjoyed while the mixture was imbibed.

The ground and whisked teas used then called for dark and patterned bowls in which the texture of the tea powder suspension could be enjoyed. The best of these bowls, glazed in patterns with names like oil spot, partridge-feather, hare's fur, and tortoise shell, are highly valued today. The patterned holding bowl and tea mixture were often lauded in the period's poetry with phrases such as "partridge in swirling clouds" or "snow on hare's fur". Tea in this period was enjoyed more for its patterns and less for its flavour. The practise of powdered tea can still be seen in the Japanese Tea ceremony or Chadō.

Loose-leaf tea phase

After 1391, the Hongwu Emperor, the founder of the Ming dynasty, decreed that tributes of tea to the court were to be changed from brick to loose-leaf form. The imperial decree quickly transformed the tea-drinking habits of the people, changing from whisked teas to steeped teas. The arrival of the new method for preparing tea also required the creation or use of new vessels.

The tea pot was needed such that the tea leaves can be steeped separately from the drinking vessel for an infusion of proper concentration. The tea must be kept warm, and the leaves must be separated from the resulting infusion when required.
Tea caddies and containers also became necessary to keep the tea and conserve its flavour. This was because tea leaves do not preserve as well as tea bricks. Furthermore, the natural aroma of tea became the focus of tea drinking due to the new preparation method.
A change in Chinese tea drinking vessels was evident. Smaller bowls with plain or simple designs on the interior surfaces were favoured over the larger patterned bowls used for enjoying the patterns created by powdered teas. Tea drinking in small bowls and cups was likely adopted since it gathers and directs the fragrant steam from the tea to the nose, allowing for a better appreciation of the tea's flavour.
Teawares made with a special kind of purple clay (Zisha) from Yixing went on to develop during this period (Ming dynasty). Purple clay's structure made it an advantageous material with tiny and high density, preferred for heat preservation and perviousness.
Simplicity and rusticity dominated the idea of purple clay teaware decoration art. It soon became the most popular method of performing Chinese tea ceremony, which often combines literature, calligraphy, painting, and seal cutting in Chinese culture.

Loose-leaf tea and purple clay teaware is still the preferred tea preparation method in Chinese daily life.

Hong Kong
The English-style tea has evolved into a new local style of drink, the Hong Kong-style milk tea, more often simply "milk tea", in Hong Kong by using evaporated milk instead of ordinary milk. It is popular at cha chaan tengs and fast food shops such as Café de Coral and Maxims Express. Traditional Chinese tea, including green tea, flower tea, jasmine tea, and Pu-erh tea, are also common, and are served at dim sum restaurants during yum cha.

Another Hong Kong speciality is lemon tea - served in cafes and restaurants as regular black tea with several slices of fresh lemon, either hot or cold, with a pot of sugar to add to taste. In 1979, local drinks manufacturer Vitasoy introduced a packaged brand, which remains popular and is gaining market traction in mainland China. Other brands followed suit in Hong Kong.

Tibet

Butter, milk, and salt are added to brewed tea and churned to form a hot drink called Po cha (bod ja, where bod means Tibetan and ja tea) in Tibet, Bhutan, and Nepal. The concoction is sometimes called cha su mar, mainly in Kham, or Eastern Tibet. Traditionally, the drink is made with a domestic brick tea and yak's milk, then mixed in a churn for several minutes. Using a generic black tea, milk, and butter, and shaking or blending work well too, although the unique taste of yak milk is difficult to replicate. (see recipe)

Tibet tea drinking has many rules. One such concerns an invitation to a house for tea. The host will first pour some highland barley wine. The guest must dip his finger in the wine and flick some away. This will be done three times to represent respect for the Buddha, Dharma, and Sangha. The cup will then be refilled two more times, and on the last time, it must be emptied, or the host will be insulted. After this, the host will present a gift of butter tea to the guest, who will accept it without touching the bowl's rim. The guest will then pour a glass for himself and must finish the glass or be seen as rude.

Two main teas go with the tea culture. The teas are butter tea and sweet milk tea. These two teas are only found in Tibet. Other teas that Tibetans enjoy are boiled black teas. Many tea shops in Tibet sell these teas, which travelers often take as their primary hydration source.

Japan

Green tea's traditional role in Japanese society is as a drink for special guests and occasions. Green tea is served in many companies during afternoon breaks. Japanese often buy sweets for their colleagues when on vacation or business trips. These snacks are usually enjoyed with green tea. Tea will also be prepared for visitors coming for company meetings and guests visiting Japanese homes. A thermos full of green tea is a staple on family or school outings as an accompaniment to bento (box lunches). Families often bring along proper Japanese teacups to enhance the enjoyment of the traditional drink.

The strong cultural association Japan has with green tea has made it the most popular beverage to drink in traditional Japanese cuisine, such as sushi, sashimi, and tempura. At a restaurant, a cup of green tea is often served with meals at no extra charge, with as many refills as desired. The best traditional Japanese restaurants take as much care in choosing the tea they serve as in preparing the food.

Many Japanese are still taught the proper art of the centuries-old tea ceremony as well. Still, the Japanese now enjoy green tea processed using state-of-the-art technology. Today, hand pressing—a method demonstrated to tourists—is taught only as a technique preserved as a part of the Japanese cultural tradition. Most ubiquitous vending machines also carry a wide selection of hot and cold bottled teas. Oolong tea enjoys considerable popularity. Black tea, often with milk or lemon, is served ubiquitously in cafes, coffee shops, and restaurants.

Major tea-producing areas in Japan include Shizuoka Prefecture and the city of Uji in Kyoto Prefecture.

Other infusions bearing the name cha are barley tea (mugi-cha) which is popular as a cold drink in the summer, buckwheat tea (soba-cha), and hydrangea tea (ama-cha).

Korea 

The Korean tea ceremony or darye (茶禮) is a traditional form of tea ceremony practised in Korea. Darye literally refers to "etiquette for tea" or "tea rite." The chief element of the Korean tea ceremony is the ease and naturalness of enjoying tea within an easy formal setting. Central to the Korean approach to tea is an easy and natural coherence, with fewer formal rituals, fewer absolutes, greater freedom for relaxation, and more creativity in enjoying a wider variety of teas, services, and conversation.

Taiwan

Taiwanese tea culture encompasses a more traditional Chinese tea culture followed by centuries of Han Chinese migrations onto the island. Wild tea was first found in Taiwan by the Dutch East India Company. Since then, successive waves of immigration from mainland China to Taiwan have left a legacy of influences on tea culture.

Bubble tea, pearl milk tea, or boba milk tea is a tea beverage mixture with milk which includes balls of tapioca. Originating in Taiwan, it is especially popular in East Asia and Southeast Asia, including Japan, South Korea, China, Hong Kong, Thailand, Malaysia, the Philippines, Vietnam, Singapore, as well as India, Sri Lanka, Europe, Canada, and the United States. It is also known as black pearl tea or tapioca tea.

Southeast Asia

Indonesia
Tea drinking is deeply ingrained in Indonesian culture, with adults and children alike enjoying several cups a day from hot to sweet cold drinks. There are several notable regional variants of Indonesian tea drink besides the common es teh manis (sweet iced tea). 

Teh talua is a Minang tea drink consists of tea powder, raw egg, sugar, and citrus. It becomes an intangible cultural heritage by the Indonesian Ministry of Education and Culture.

Then , a tea specially brewed in clay pots and cups. This drink is added with gula batu (rock sugar) and drunk hot. It usually uses green tea or jasmine tea which gives off a distinctive aroma, and is usually served in the morning, afternoon or evening accompanied by snacks. Teh poci can be easily found in the city of Tegal.

Nyaneut, is the name pinned for the tradition of drinking tea typical of the people of Garut. The tradition is usually carried out to welcome the Islamic New Year. At first, Nyaneut began when the Dutch scientist Karel Frederik Hole opened tea plantations in Cigedug and Bayongbong in the 19th century. Since then the area has been a producer of high quality tea. Nyaneut has also become a habit for the people of Garut and its surroundings who are at the foot of Mount Cikurai to warm their bodies. It has its own characteristics in its implementation. Usually tea is served to guests along with a snack in the form of boiled cassava. In the process of drinking tea, it begins by rotating the tea glass in the palm of the hand twice, after that the aroma of the tea must be inhaled 3 times first, then the tea may be drunk.

In Yogyakarta, patehan is part of the Royal Palace of Yogyakarta which is in charge of preparing drinks, especially tea, along with all the equipment for the needs of the palace. Both for traditional ceremonies and for routine daily needs. Water for making tea is taken from a special well called Nyai Jalatunda near the royal tea brewery called gedhong patehan. Patehan's daily agenda is to prepare a tea routine at 6.00 am and 11.00 am for the sultan. The tea is delivered in a procession of 5 female courtiers.

Betawi people has a tea tradition called nyahi. It is said that the word "nyahi" itself comes from Arabic culture, from the word "syay" which means tea. Nyahi activities are usually done with family or friends in the afternoon a few hours after lunch time. What is drunk is teh tubruk, which is a drink made from dry tea leaves which is brewed directly without filtering it, placed in a canned teapot or a teapot made of brass. The tradition is usually enjoyed with coconut sugar. The sweetener will be bitten first, followed by sipping hot tea. It is accompanied by some snacks like kue ape, boiled peanuts, boiled banana, wajik, kue apem, and so on.

Myanmar
Myanmar is one of the very few countries where tea is not only drunk but eaten as lahpet—pickled tea served with various accompaniments. It is called lahpet so (tea wet) in contrast to lahpet chauk (tea dry) or akyan jauk (crude dry) with which green tea—yeinway jan or lahpet yeijan meaning plain or crude tea—is made. In the Shan State of Myanmar, where most of the tea is grown, and also Kachin State, tea is dry-roasted in a pan before adding boiling water to make green tea. It is the national drink. Tea sweetened with milk is known as lahpet yeijo made with acho jauk (sweet dry) or black tea and prepared the Indian way, brewed and sweetened with condensed milk. It is a very popular drink, although the middle classes, by and large, appear to prefer coffee most of the time. It was introduced to Myanmar by Indian immigrants, some of whom set up teashops known as kaka hsaing, later evolving to just lahpetyei hsaing (teashop).

It is common for Burmese to gather in tea shops drinking Indian tea served with a diverse range of snacks. Green tea is customarily the first thing to be served free of charge as soon as a customer sits down at a table in all restaurants as well as teashops.

Teashops are extremely prevalent, and are open for breakfast till late in the evening, with some even open for 24-hour catering for long-distance drivers and travellers.

Lahpet

Lahpet (pickled tea) is served in one of two ways:
 A-hlu lahpet or Mandalay lahpet is served on a plate or traditionally in a shallow lacquerware dish called lahpet ohk with a lid and divided into small compartments—pickled tea laced with sesame oil in a central compartment, and other ingredients such as crisp fried garlic, peas and peanuts, toasted sesame, crushed dried shrimp, preserved shredded ginger and fried shredded coconut in other compartments encircling it. It may be served as a snack or after a meal with green tea on special occasions or just for family and visitors. A-hlu means alms and is synonymous with a novitiation ceremony called Shinbyu although lahpet is served in this form also at hsun jway (offering a meal to monks) and weddings. Invitation to a shinbyu is traditionally by calling from door to door with a lahpet ohk; acceptance is indicated by its partaking.
 Lahpet thouk or Yangon lahpet is a pickled tea salad very popular all over Myanmar, especially with women, and some teashops would have it on their menu as well as Burmese restaurants. It is prepared by mixing all the above ingredients without the coconut. It also includes fresh tomatoes, garlic, and green chili and is dressed with fish sauce, sesame or peanut oil, and a squeeze of lime. Some of the most popular brands sold in packets include Ayee Taung lahpet from Mandalay, Shwe Toak from Mogok, Yuzana and Pinpyo Ywetnu from Yangon. Hnapyan jaw (twice fried) ready-mixed garnish is also available today.

Thailand
Thai tea (also known as Thai iced tea) or "cha-yen" when ordered in Thailand is a drink made from strongly-brewed red tea that usually contains added anise, red and yellow food colouring, and sometimes other spices as well. This tea is sweetened with sugar and condensed milk and served chilled. Evaporated or whole milk is generally poured over the tea and ice before serving without mixing to add taste and creamy appearance. Locally, it is served in a traditional tall glass, and when ordered take-out, it is poured over the crushed ice in a transparent (or translucent) plastic bag. It can be made into a frappé at more westernised vendors.

It is popular in Southeast Asia and in many American restaurants that serve Thai or Vietnamese food, especially on the West Coast of the United States. Although Thai tea is not the same as bubble tea, a Southeast and East Asian beverage that contains large black pearls of tapioca starch, Thai tea with pearls is a popular flavour of bubble tea.

Green tea is also prevalent in Thailand, spawning many variations such as barley green tea, rose green tea, lemon green tea, etc. Thai green tea, however, is not to be confused with traditional Japanese green tea. Thai green tea tends to be very heavily commercialised and tastes sweeter.

Vietnam
Tea culture within Vietnam is ancient and is home to some of the oldest living tea plants. Before French colonization, tea was primarily produced for personal and local-market consumption. The first tea plantation was established in 1890 within the Phu Tho province and was very successful. During the twentieth century, Vietnam saw a surge in tea production and began exporting tea worldwide. As of 2015, a study conducted by the United Nations concluded that Vietnam was the world's fifth largest exporter of tea. In the same year, it was estimated that 80% of the total yield was dedicated to foreign markets.

The word in the Vietnamese language is trà ( or ) or chè ( or ). It is served unsweetened and unaccompanied by milk, cream, or lemon.

Traditionally tea is frequently consumed as green tea (trà xanh). Variants of black tea (chè tàu) are also widely used although frequently scented with Jasminum sambac blossoms (chè nhài, trà lài). Huế is renowned for its tea scented with Nelumbo nucifera stamens (trà sen).

In Vietnamese restaurants, including eateries overseas, a complimentary pot of tea is usually served once the meal has been ordered, with refills free of charge.

Central Asia

Tea was transported to Central Asia through the Silk Road. In Kazakhstan, traditional tea is black traditionally with milk. In Uzbekistan, traditional tea is green.

Tea is the unofficial national drink of Afghanistan, where it is widely consumed and offered to visitors. Both green and black tea are used (although green is preferred), and cardamom, saffron or blocks of sugar are often added, but normally without milk. Teahouses are common, which are locally called chai-khana.

In Mongolia, suutei tsai is a traditional beverage of tea with milk.

South Asia

Bangladesh 

The habit of drinking tea in Bangladesh was started by the British during the British colonial period. The first Tea garden in Bangladesh was established in 1849 at Malnicherra, Sylhet district. Since then, tea has become a popular Beverage among the Bangladeshis. In 2021, about 96.50 million kilograms (kgs) of the plant were produced by 167 farms across Bangladesh and almost 75% of them are consumed within the country. Teas are primarily served here to guests and usually drunk at breakfast and snack during any time of the day. The Bangladeshi tea culture has developed around the Tea stalls, which are the social gathering centres in the villages and communities. Different variants of tea such as Milk tea, Black tea, Malai chai, Lemon tea, and Seven Color Tea from Srimangal are highly popular in Bangladesh.

India

One of the world's largest tea producers, India is a country where tea is popular as a breakfast and evening drink. It is often served as masala chai with milk, sugar, and spices such as ginger, cardamom, black pepper, and cinnamon. Almost all the tea consumed is black Indian tea, CTC variety. Usually, tea leaves are boiled in the water while making tea, and milk is added.

Offering tea to visitors is the cultural norm in Indian homes, offices, and places of business. Tea is often consumed at small roadside stands, prepared by tea makers known as chai wallahs.

There are three most famous regions in India to produce black teas- Darjeeling, Assam, and Nilgiri. "Strong, heavy and fragrant" are three criteria for judging black tea.
Darjeeling tea is known for its delicate aroma and light colour and is aptly termed "the champagne of teas", which has a high aroma and yellow or brown liquid after brewing. Assam tea is known for its robust taste and dark colour, and Nilgiri tea is dark, intensely aromatic, and flavoured. Assam produces the largest quantity of Tea in India, mostly of the CTC variety, and is one of the biggest suppliers of major international brands such as Lipton and Tetley. The Tetley Brand, formerly British owned and one of the largest, is now owned by the Indian Tata Tea Limited company.

On April 21, 2012, the Deputy Chairman of Planning Commission (India), Montek Singh Ahluwalia, said that tea would be declared a national drink by April 2013. Speaking on the occasion, former Assam Chief Minister Tarun Gogoi said a special package for the tea industry would be announced in the future to ensure its development. The move was expected to boost the tea industry in the country, but in May 2013 the ministry of commerce decided not to declare a national drink for fear of disrupting the competing coffee industry.

Pakistan

Tea is popular all over Pakistan and is referred to as chai (چائے). During British rule, tea became very popular in Lahore. Tea is usually consumed at breakfast, during lunch breaks at the workplace, and in the evening at home. Evening tea may be consumed with biscuits or cake. Guests are typically offered a choice between tea and soft drinks. It is common practise for homeowners to offer tea breaks to hired labour and sometimes even provide them with tea during the breaks. The tea offered to labour is typically strong and has more sugar.

In Pakistan, both black and green teas are popular and are known locally as sabz chai and kahwah, respectively. The popular green tea called kahwah is often served after every meal in Khyber Pakhtunkhwa and the Pashtun belt of Balochistan. In Lahore and other cities of Punjab, Kashmiri chai or cha is common, brought by ethnic Kashmiris in the 19th century. Traditionally, it is prepared with Himalayan rock salt, giving it its characteristic pink color. It is taken with Bakar khani and Kashmiri kulcha (namkeen/salty version of Khand kulcha). Namkeen chai or noon/loon Cha or commonly called Kashmiri chai, and sometimes sheer (milk) cha or sabz chai (green tea as the same tea are used for making khahwa/green tea) is sold and seen in Gawalmandi kiosks with salt for Kashmiri as well as with sugar and pistachios for non-Kashmris. In the northern Pakistan regions of Chitral and Gilgit-Baltistan, a salty buttered Tibetan-style tea is consumed.

Sri Lanka
In Sri Lanka, black tea is usually served with milk and sugar, but the milk is always warmed. Tea is a hugely popular beverage among the Sri Lankan people, and part of its land is surrounded by the many hills of tea plantations that spread for miles. Drinking tea has become part of the culture of Sri Lanka, and it is customary to offer a cup of tea to guests. Many working Sri Lankans are used to having a mid-morning cup of tea and another in the afternoon. Black tea is sometimes consumed with ginger. In rural areas, some people still have tea with a piece of sweet jaggery.

West Asia

Iran

Tea found its way to Persia (Iran) through the Silk Road from India and soon became the national drink. The whole part of northern Iran along the shores of the Caspian Sea is suitable for the cultivation of tea. Especially in the Gilan province on the slopes of Alborz, large areas are under tea cultivation, and millions of people work in the tea industry. That region covers a large part of Iran's need for tea. Iranians have one of the highest per capita rates of tea consumption in the world, and since old times every street has had a Châikhâne (Tea House). Châikhânes are still an important social place. Iranians traditionally drink tea by pouring it into a saucer and putting a lump of rock sugar (nabât) in the mouth before drinking the tea.

Africa

Algeria

Mint tea is central to social life in the Maghreb and is very popular among the Tuareg people of Algeria, Libya, Niger, and Mali. The serving can be ceremonial, especially when prepared for a guest. The tea is traditionally made by the head male in the family and offered to guests as a sign of hospitality. Typically, at least three glasses of tea are served.
Tea is consumed throughout the day as a social activity.

Mint has been used as an infusion, decoction, and herbal medicine throughout the Mediterranean since Antiquity. This aromatic plant was widely used in Algeria to cure and prevent cholera when it plagued the country from 1835 until 1865.

Egypt
Tea is the national drink in Egypt. In Egypt, tea is called "shai". Tea packed and sold in Egypt is almost exclusively imported from Kenya and Sri Lanka. The Egyptian government considers tea a strategic crop and runs large tea plantations in Kenya. Green tea is a recent arrival to Egypt (only in the late 1990s did green tea become affordable) and is not as popular.

Egyptian tea comes in two varieties: Koshary and Saiidi. Koshary tea, popular in Lower (Northern) Egypt, is prepared using the traditional method of steeping black tea in boiled water and letting it set for a few minutes. It is almost always sweetened with cane sugar and is often flavored with fresh mint leaves. Adding milk is also common. Koshary tea is usually light, with less than a half teaspoonful per cup considered to be near the high end.

Saiidi tea is typical in Upper (Southern) Egypt. It is prepared by boiling black tea with water for 5 minutes over an intense flame. Saiidi tea is extremely heavy, with two teaspoonfuls per cup being the norm. It is sweetened with copious amounts of cane sugar (a necessity since the formula and method yield a very bitter tea). Saiidi tea is often black, even in liquid form.

Besides true tea, herbal teas (or tisanes) are often served at the Egyptian teahouses, with ingredients ranging from mint to cinnamon and ginger to salep; many of these are ascribed medicinal qualities or health benefits in Egyptian folk medicine. Karkade, a tisane of hibiscus flowers, is a particularly popular beverage and is traditionally considered beneficial for the heart.

Libya

Libyan tea is a strong black or green beverage served in small glass cups with foam or froth topping the glass. It is usually sweetened with sugar and traditionally served in three rounds. Mint or basil is used for flavoring; traditionally, the last round is served with boiled peanuts or almonds.

Mauritius
Tea plays an integral part in the culture of Mauritius. Tea drinking allows for socialising, commonly served to guests and in the workplace.

The Mauritian peoples usually consume black tea, often with milk and sugar. Mauritius is a tea producer, initially on a small scale when the French introduced the plant into the island around 1765. It was under later British rule that the scale of tea cultivation increased.

Three major tea producers dominate the local market: Bois Cheri, Chartreuse, and Corson. The signature product is vanilla-flavoured tea, commonly bought and consumed on the island.

Morocco

Morocco is considered the largest importer of green tea worldwide.

Morocco consumes green tea with mint rather than black tea. It has become part of the culture and is used widely at almost every meal. The Moroccan people even make tea performances a unique culture in the flower country. Moroccan tea is commonly served with rich tea cookies, fresh green mint leaves, local "finger shape" brown sugar, and colorful tea glasses and pots.

Sahel

In the Sahel region on the southern fringe of the Sahara (such as in Mali, Niger, and Algeria), green gunpowder tea is prepared with little water and large amounts of sugar. By pouring the tea into the glasses and back, foam builds on the tea. Sahelian tea is a social occasion and has three infusions, the first one is very bitter ("bitter as death"), the second in between ("flavorful as life"), and the last one is rather sweet ("sweet as love") are taken over several hours. Drinking tea is a social activity that is accompanied by conversation and storytelling.

Europe

Czech Republic and Slovakia
Specific tea culture has developed in the Czech Republic in recent years, including many styles of tearooms. Despite having the same name, they differ from British tearooms. Pure teas are usually prepared concerning their country of origin, and good tea palaces may offer 80 teas from almost all tea-producing countries. Different tea rooms have also created blends and methods of preparation and serving.

Although less visible than in the Czech Republic, tea culture exists in Slovakia. Tea rooms are considered an underground environment by many, but they continue to pop up almost in every middle-sized town. These tea rooms are appreciated for offering quiet environments with pleasant music. More importantly, they are usually non-smoking, unlike most pubs and cafés.

Germany

While coffee remains more popular than tea in Germany, the region of East Frisia is noted for its consumption of tea and its tea culture. Nearly 75 percent of all tea imported to Germany is consumed in this region.

Intense blends of Assam tea, Ceylon, and Darjeeling (East-Frisian Blend) are served whenever there are visitors to an East Frisian home or other gatherings, as well as with breakfast, mid-afternoon, and mid-evening. The traditional preparation is as follows: A Kluntje, a white rock candy sugar that melts slowly, is added to the empty cup (allowing multiple cups to be sweetened), then the tea is poured over the Kluntje. A heavy cream "cloud" ("Wölkje"—a diminutive of 'cloud' in Frisian) is added to the tea "water", the sugar represents "land". It is served without a spoon and traditionally drunk unstirred, i. e. in three tiers: In the beginning, one predominantly tastes the cream, then the tea, and finally, the sweet taste of kluntje at the bottom of the cup. Stirring the tea would blend all three tiers into one and spoil the traditional tea savouring. The tea is served with small cookies during the week and cakes during special occasions or on weekends as a special treat. Some of the most common traditional cakes and pastries to accompany tea are apple strudel, black forest cake, and other cakes flavored with chocolate and hazelnut.

 The tea is said to cure headaches, stomach problems, and stress, among many other ailments. The tea set is commonly decorated with an East Friesian Rose design. As a guest, it is considered impolite to drink fewer than three cups of tea. Placing your cup upside down on the saucer or your spoon in the cup signals that you are finished and want no more tea.

Russia

The podstakannik ('подстаканник'), or tea glass holder (literally "thing under the glass"), is a part of Russian tea tradition. A Russian tea glass-holder is a traditional way of serving and drinking tea in Russia, Ukraine, Belarus, and other CIS and ex-USSR countries. Expensive podstakanniks are made from silver, classic series are made mostly from nickel silver, cupronickel, and other alloys with nickel, silver or gold plating. In Russia, it is customary to drink tea brewed separately in a teapot and diluted with freshly boiled water ('pair-of-teapots tea', 'чай парой чайников'). Traditionally, the tea is robust, its strength often indicating the hosts' degree of hospitality. The traditional implement for boiling water for tea used to be the samovar (and sometimes it still is, though usually electric). Tea is a family event and is usually served after each meal with sugar (one to three teaspoonfuls per cup), lemon (but without milk), and an assortment of jams, pastries, and confections. Black tea is commonly used, with green tea gaining popularity as a healthier, more "Oriental" alternative. Teabags are not used in the traditional Russian tea ceremony, only loose, large-leaf black tea.

In Russian prisons, where alcohol and drugs are prohibited, inmates often brew robust tea known as 'chifir' to experience its mood-altering properties.

France

While France is well known for its coffee drinking, afternoon tea has long been a social habit of the upper-middle class. Mariage Frères is a famous high-end tea shop from Paris, active since 1854. Tea in France is of the black variety, but Asian green teas and fruit-flavoured teas are becoming increasingly popular. French people generally drink tea in the afternoon. It is often taken in salons de thé. Tea is usually served with some pastries, both sweet and pastries made especially for tea.

Ireland

Although broadly similar to tea culture in the United Kingdom, Irish tea culture's main distinguishing feature are the slightly spicier and stronger flavours than traditional English blends. Popular brands of tea sold in Ireland are Barry's, Bewley's and Lyons.

Portugal
Portugal was the first to introduce the practise of drinking tea to Europe and the first European country to produce tea.

A century later, with the introduction of skilled workers from the Macau Region of China in 1883, production became significant, and the culture expanded. Following the instructions of these workers, the species Jasminum grandiflorum and Malva vacciones were introduced to give 'nobility' to the tea aroma, though only the Jasminum was used.

This tea is currently traded under the name of the processed compound, Gorreana, and is produced by independent families. No herbicides or pesticides are allowed in the growing process, and modern consumers associate the production with more recent organic teas. However, production standards concerning the plant and cropping have not changed for the last 250 years.

Turkey

Turkish tea or Çay is produced on the eastern Black Sea coast, which has a mild climate with high precipitation and fertile soil. Turkish tea is typically prepared using çaydanlık, an instrument especially designed for tea preparation, essentially an on-top-of-the-kitchen-range replacement for the more traditional samovar. Water is brought to a boil in the larger lower kettle, and then some of the water is used to fill the smaller kettle on top - demlik - and steep several spoons of loose tea leaves, producing a strong tea. When served, the continually cooking water from the bottom part is used to dilute the strong tea from the top part on a per-cup basis, giving each serving the choice between strong ("koyu"/dark) or weak ("açık"/light). Tea is drunk from small glasses to enjoy it hot in addition to showing its colour, with lumps of beetroot sugar, either dissolved in the cup for sweetness or pressed between the tongue tip and upper palate for reduced sugar intake (kırtlama). To a lesser extent than in other Muslim countries, tea replaces both alcohol and coffee as the social beverage. Within Turkey, tea is usually known as Rize tea.

In 2004, Turkey produced 205,500 tonnes of tea (6.4% of the world's total tea production), which made it one of the largest tea markets in the world, with 120,000 tons being consumed in Turkey, and the rest being exported. Tea is grown mostly in Rize Province on the Black Sea coast.

United Kingdom

Tea is usually black tea served with milk and often with sugar. Strong tea served with milk and optionally one or more teaspoons of sugar, usually in a mug, is commonly referred to as builder's tea for its association with builders and, more broadly, with the working class. Much of the time in the United Kingdom, tea drinking is not the delicate, refined cultural expression that the rest of the world imagines—a cup (or commonly a mug) of tea is something drunk frequently throughout the day. This is not to say that the British do not have a more formal tea ceremony, but tea breaks are an essential part of the working day. The term is often shortened to 'tea', indicating a break. This term was exported to the game of cricket and consequently to most other countries of the former British Empire.

History

The popularity of tea dates back to the 19th century when India was part of the British Empire, and British interests controlled tea production in the subcontinent. It was, however, first introduced in the UK by the Portuguese Catherine of Braganza, queen consort of Charles II in the 1660s and 1670s. As tea spread throughout the United Kingdom and through the social classes, tea gardens and tea dances developed. These include watching fireworks or a dinner party and dance, concluding with an evening tea. The tea gardens lost value after World War II, but tea dances are still held today in the UK.

Some scholars suggest that tea played a role in the Industrial Revolution. Afternoon tea possibly became a way to increase the number of hours labourers could work in factories; the stimulants in the tea, accompanied by sugary snacks, would give workers energy to finish out the day's work. Further, tea helped alleviate some of the consequences of the urbanisation that accompanied the industrial revolution: drinking tea required boiling one's water, thereby killing water-borne diseases like dysentery, cholera, and typhoid.

Tea as a meal

In the United Kingdom, tea is not only the beverage's name but also the meal's name. The kind of meal a person means depends significantly on their social background and where they live. The differentiation in usage between dinner, supper, lunch, and tea is one of the classic social markers of British English (see U and non-U English).

Commonwealth countries

Afternoon tea and its variants are the best-known "tea ceremony" in the Commonwealth countries, available in homes and commercial establishments. In some varieties of English, "tea" refers to a savoury meal. Taiwanese bubble tea, known locally as pearl milk tea, has become widely popular in urban Australia and New Zealand, with multiple chains in every major city.

North America

Canada
In Canada, various types of tea are used by many indigenous tribes as healing and ceremonial medicines. For example, Ojibwe and Cree tribes in Ontario use Cedar Tea during sweat lodge ceremonies to cleanse and nourish their bodies. When European settlers arrived on North American shores, it was the indigenous people that taught them to make pine needle tea to help cure their scurvy; pine needles are a great source of vitamin C.

Tea remains a popular hot drink among Canadians of European (especially British and Irish) heritage. Black orange pekoe tea and other breakfast-style teas may be drunk with the morning meal or during a mid-morning or afternoon break. These types of teas are typically served with milk and sugar. Red Rose and King Cole are some of the more well-known Canadian brands of tea, and the Tim Hortons chain of cafés serves their ready-to-drink hot “steeped tea”, a strong breakfast-style tea. Cookies, tea biscuits or scones, and other pastries may accompany any tea that is served, but formal “afternoon tea" in the British tradition is typically confined to tourist destinations, such as Victoria's Empress Hotel or Toronto's Royal York Hotel.

United States

American tea culture encompasses the methods of preparation and means of consumption of tea within the context of the culture of the United States. American restaurants and workplaces typically offer machine-made drip brew coffee by default, while hot tea brewed by the cup with tea bags is available by request. Tea parties can be celebrated for many occasions, from the very small and intimate to the large family gatherings and celebrations.

In the Southern United States, a regional favorite called sweet tea – which is brewed, sweetened, and chilled before consumption – may be served at all meals and throughout the day as an alternative to other beverages. In the United States, about 85% of the tea consumed is served cold or iced. Iced tea is more frequently consumed during periods of hot weather or in lower latitudes, and hot tea is likewise more common in colder weather. Any confusion when visiting different parts of the country can easily be solved by explicitly asking for either "hot tea" or "iced tea." Afternoon tea, as a meal, is rarely served in the US except on ritualized special occasions such as the tea party or an afternoon out at a high-end hotel or restaurant, which may also offer cream tea on their menu.

Camellia sinensis, the source of tea leaves and buds, can be grown in warmer parts of the United States. Commercial cultivation has been tried at various times and locations since the 1700s, but tea has remained a niche crop and has never been cultivated widely in the United States. As of 2020, the US mainland has one relatively large plantation with complete mechanization in Charleston, South Carolina, and numerous small commercial tea gardens that pick tea by hand. Some growers feel that tea production is not viable without some mechanization, but there is evidence that unmechanized tea production is viable, albeit with lower net profit margins. Most domestically grown teas are available through mail order and online purchases.

As of 2016, the Charleston Tea Garden, located on Wadmalaw Island, outside of Charleston, South Carolina, is the only large-scale tea plantation in the United States, at 127 acres. Smaller scale commercial farms are located in the states of Alabama, Hawaii, Oregon, South Carolina, and Washington. There are also a handful of commercial farms in the process of being developed in the states of South Carolina, Mississippi, New York, and Texas. Still, they have yet to reach the point of selling products to the general public regularly.

Formal tea

Formal tea service, hosted at home or a historic building as part of a social event, is part of the United States culture, a skill preserved and passed down from generation to generation through the hereditary families whose ancestors founded the 13 New England colonies or fought in the American Revolution. There are hundreds of heritage societies. Many of the oldest are listed in the Hereditary Register of the United States of America.   
A formal tea is often hosted in the home of a society lady or by an organization, primarily of women. There may be a formal meeting followed by socialization amongst those present where introductions are made, and recognitions are given. A formal tea might be referred to as a tea party and where the women who are hosting the party or attending the party are well known in their local society, there might also be a newspaper article mentioning prominent society members and their families who attended the event.

Tea as popular culture
In the United States, tea can typically be served at all meals as an alternative to coffee when served hot or soft drinks when served iced. Tea is also consumed throughout the day as a beverage. Afternoon tea, the meal done in the English tradition, is rarely served in the United States, although it remains romanticized by small children; it is usually reserved for special occasions like tea parties. 

Rather than drinking tea hot, many Americans prefer tea served with ice. In fact, in the United States, about 80% of the tea consumed is served cold or "iced". Iced tea has become an iconic symbol of the Southern United States and Southern hospitality, often appearing alongside summer barbecue cooking or grilled foods. Iced tea is often made as sweet tea, which is simply iced tea with copious amounts of sugar or sweetener.

Iced tea can be purchased like soda in canned or bottled form at vending machines and convenience stores. This pre-made tea is usually sweetened. Sometimes some other flavorings, such as lemon or raspberry, are added. Many restaurants dispense iced tea brewed throughout the day from upright containers.  

Decaffeinated tea is widely available in the United States for those who wish to reduce the physiological effects of caffeine.

Before World War II, the US preference for tea was equally split between green tea and black tea, 40% and 40%, with the remaining 20% preferring oolong tea. The war cut off the United States from its primary sources of green tea, China and Japan, leaving it with tea almost exclusively from British-controlled India, which produced black tea. After the war, nearly 99% of the tea consumed was black tea. Green, oolong, and white teas have recently become more popular again, and are often touted as health foods.

Fast-food coffee chains have significantly impacted how Americans are exposed to herbal and exotic teas. Once considered a rarity, chai, based on Indian masala chai, has become a popular option for people who might drink a caffè latte. Although not as commercialized.

Taiwanese-style bubble tea was introduced in the United States in the 1990s, but interest began to swell in the early to mid-2000s owing to the widespread success of bubble tea chains. Offering variations of the traditional bubble tea form (milk tea with tapioca pearls) was effective in bringing in a more diverse client base for popular bubble tea chains like Boba Guys.

South America

Argentina
While Argentina is mainly a coffee culture due to its roots in Spain and Italy, Argentina shares in the unique mate culture of the Rioplatense region. Argentines are known for carrying around a mate, or gourd, and bombilla, a special straining straw, to share mate with friends, family, and strangers throughout the day. The tea itself is known as yerba mate.

Brazil

Brazilian tea culture has its origins with the infused beverages or chás, made by the indigenous cultures of the south region. It has evolved since the Portuguese colonial period to include imported varieties and tea-drinking customs. There is a folk knowledge in Brazil which says that Brazilians, mainly the urban ones, have a greater taste for using sugar in teas than in other cultures due to the lack of habit to unsweetened drinks.

Chile
Chilean tea consumption per capita ranks amongst the highest in the world and is by far the highest within Latin America. Chile's tea culture draws back to both English immigration and the general Anglophilia within the Chilean elites during the 19th century, with consumption of the drink spreading quickly among all social classes as inexpensive alternatives reached the market. Besides black and green tea, Chileans often store herbal infusions, such as chamomile and matico. Although there is not a fixed moment of the day for tea consumption (it being a common breakfast alternative to coffee and also a regular after-lunch staple), it is most commonly associated with the late afternoon meal of the once (lit. 'elevenses' in Spanish, though contrary to most variations of the meal it is not a morning snack), which most Chileans report as having instead of dinner.

Oceania

Australia

Australian cuisine has historically been influenced by British cuisine and British Tea Culture. Australian Indigenous people usually drank native tea. However, tea consumption in Australia increased because of British Colonisation of the island.

New Zealand
New Zealand is one of the highest tea consumption countries per capita in the World and Oceania. Like Canada and Australia, New Zealand Tea Culture is influenced by British Tea Culture.

See also

 Cannabis culture
 Drinking culture
 International Tea Day
 Teacake
 Teaism
 Yerba mate
 History of tea

References

External links

Culture
Culture
 
Urban culture